Shashack is an ancestor of King Saul and the father of Elam in  the Books of Chronicles (Chronicles I 8:14).

Books of Chronicles people